Wolfgang Amadeus Mozart's Piano Sonata No. 7 in C major, K. 309 (284b) (1777) is a piano sonata in three movements:

A typical performance takes about 16 minutes.

The work was composed during a journey to Mannheim and Paris in 1777-78. In a letter to his father dated October 24 1777, Mozart describes a concert where he played "a magnificent sonata in C major with a closing rondo, my own invention," suggesting that the sonata was completed by October 1777. The andante movement is a "portrait" of his pupil Rose Cannabich, the 13-year-old daughter of the Mannheim Kapellmeister Christian Cannabich. Upon reviewing a copy of the manuscript, Mozart's father Leopold wrote that it was "a strange composition. It has something in it of the 'rather artificial' Mannheim style, but so very little that your own good style is not spoilt".

References

Mozart Sonata in C for piano K.309/284b

External links

  (Alte Mozart-Ausgabe version)
Performance of Piano Sonata No. 7 by Paavali Jumppanen from the Isabella Stewart Gardner Museum in MP3 format

Piano Sonata 07
Compositions in C major
1777 compositions
Music dedicated to students or teachers